
Środa Wielkopolska County is a unit of territorial administration and local government (powiat) in Greater Poland Voivodeship, west-central Poland. It came into being on January 1, 1999, as a result of the Polish local government reforms passed in 1998.

As of 2006 its total population is 54,568, out of which the population of Środa Wielkopolska is 21,635 and the rural population is 32,933.

Neighbouring counties
Środa Wielkopolska County is bordered by Września County to the east, Jarocin County to the south, Śrem County to the south-west and Poznań County to the north-west.

Administrative division
The county is subdivided into five gminas (one urban-rural and four rural). These are listed in the following table, in descending order of population.

References
Polish official population figures 2006

 
Land counties of Greater Poland Voivodeship